Cusano Milanino railway station was a railway station in Italy. It served the town of Cusano Milanino.

Services
Cusano Milanino was served by the Milan–Asso railway, operated by the lombard railway company Ferrovie Nord Milano. It was replaced on 26 April 2015 by Cormano-Cusano Milanino railway station.

See also
 Milan–Asso railway

External links

 Ferrovienord official site - Cusano Milanino railway station 

Ferrovienord
Railway stations opened in 1879
Railway stations closed in 2015